Niina Kishimoto (岸本 新菜, born 30 November 1995) is a Japanese triathlete. She competed in the women's event at the 2020 Summer Olympics held in Tokyo, Japan. She also competed in the mixed relay event.

References

External links
 

1995 births
Living people
Japanese female triathletes
Olympic triathletes of Japan
Triathletes at the 2020 Summer Olympics
Sportspeople from Saitama Prefecture
21st-century Japanese women